Zhukovsky is a 1950 Soviet biopic directed by Vsevolod Pudovkin and Dmitri Vasilyev, based on the life of Russian scientist Nikolai Zhukovsky (1847–1921), founding father of modern aero- and hydrodynamics. In 1950 Pudovkin received the Best Director award at the 5th Karlovy Vary International Film Festival for this film. In 1951 Pudovkin, Shebalin, Golovnya, and Belokurov received the Stalin Prize.

Cast
 Yuri Yurovsky – Nikolai Zhukovsky
 Ilya Sudakov – Dmitri Mendeleev
 Vladimir Belokurov – Sergey Chaplygin
 Vladimir Druzhnikov – Pyotr Nesterov
 Sofiya Giatsintova – Anna Nikolaevna, Zhukovsky's Mother
 Oleg Frelikh – Aleksandr Stoletov, professor of the Moscow university
 Boris Smirnov		
 Georgi Yumatov

References

External links

1950 films
Soviet biographical drama films
Russian biographical drama films
Mosfilm films
Soviet black-and-white films
Films directed by Vsevolod Pudovkin
Films directed by Dmitri Vasilyev
1950 drama films
Russian black-and-white films
1950s Russian-language films